XOXO is the debut studio album by Canadian-Dutch-Korean singer and songwriter Jeon Somi. It was released on October 29, 2021, by The Black Label and distributed through YG Plus and Interscope Records. The album consists of eight tracks and was supported by five singles: "Birthday", "What You Waiting For", "Dumb Dumb", "XOXO" and "Anymore". The album features a guest appearance by South Korean rapper and singer Giriboy.

Background and release 
Jeon Somi, well known as the winner of the first installation of the Produce 101 competition series and a member of the series' temporary project girl group I.O.I, began to venture out as a soloist following the conclusion of group activities under her then agency JYP Entertainment. She eventually left JYP Entertainment and joined The Black Label and made her solo debut with the digital single "Birthday" and B-side track "Outta My Head" in June 2019. Jeon made two comebacks following year-long breaks with digital singles "What You Waiting For" in July 2020, and "Dumb Dumb" in August 2021. In the press conference for "Dumb Dumb", Jeon shared that she had "spent the past year practicing and recording a lot of songs apart from "Dumb Dumb" ... and there's a lot more coming." 

On October 1, 2021, the singer uploaded an image of a pile of albums, with title XOXO and her name printed on them, onto her Instagram post with the caption "Soon to be yours x̷o̷x̷o̷." On October 14, The Black Label announced that Somi is scheduled to make a comeback with her first full-length album XOXO at the end of the month. In the following week Jeon revealed the release date and shared the tracklist of the album through her social media accounts. The album was released for digital download and streaming on October 29, alongside the music video for lead single "XOXO". On December 25, the music video for "Anymore" was released.

Critical reception 

Carmen Chin writing for NME criticized the songs on the album for being "repetitive and uninspired" and stated that despite Jeon Somi's "immense musical talent", the album "fails to flesh out her identity". Chin also expressed disappointment in half of the short tracklist being made up of Somi’s previous releases.

Accolades

Track listing

Charts

Weekly charts

Monthly charts

Certifications and sales

|}

Release history

References 

2021 albums
Korean-language albums
YG Entertainment albums
Interscope Records albums